was a Japanese satirical comic magazine launched in 1905. It was based on the American Puck and featured multicolor illustrations that emphasized visual characteristics. It was the first publication of its kind in Japan to feature color illustrations.
The magazine existed until 1923 with an interruption between 1912 and 1919.

History and profile
Tokyo Puck first published in 1905. Early on it was critical of the government and several issues were prohibited from being published, but after the High Treason Incident of 1910, it became more conservative and focused more on the changes in daily life.

The editor-in-chief was Kitazawa Rakuten, the first professional cartoonist in Japan and considered the founding father of modern manga. The magazine was translated into English and Chinese and sold in not only Japan but also in the Korean peninsula, Mainland China, and Taiwan. Kitazawa Rakuten worked for the magazine until 1912 when it was temporarily folded. It was restarted in 1919, but permanently closed down in 1923.

Woodblock print artist Senpan Maekawa worked as an illustrator for the magazine early in his career.

See also
 Osaka Puck

References

1905 establishments in Japan
1923 disestablishments in Japan
Defunct magazines published in Japan
Humor magazines
Magazines established in 1905
Magazines disestablished in 1923
Magazines published in Tokyo